is a 2013 Japanese romance drama film based on Kou Nakamura's novel of the same name. Directed by Ryūichi Hiroki, it stars Tadayoshi Okura and Mirei Kiritani.

Plot 
Shuichi Fuji (Tadayoshi Okura) lost the last year of his memory after a motorcycle accident four years ago. One day, he meets Yoshimi Sawamura (Mirei Kiritani) at a friend's wedding and falls in love with her. Shuichi wants to marry her but they decide to first live together. But soon Yoshimi becomes sick.

Cast 
 Tadayoshi Okura as Shuichi Fuji
 Mirei Kiritani as Yoshimi Sawamura
 Rie Tomosaka as Natsuko Nakamura
 Shugo Oshinari as Keisuke Muto
 Haru as Keiko Ogawa
 Jun Murakami as Nagumo
 Yoshiko Miyazaki as Kazuyo Fuji
 Ren Osugi as Yasuhiko Sawamura

References

External links 
 

2013 films
2010s Japanese-language films
2010s Japanese films

ja:100回泣くこと#映画